The South Stack Lighthouse is built on the summit of a small island off the north-west coast of Holy Island, Anglesey, Wales. It was built in 1809 to warn ships of the dangerous rocks below.

History
The lighthouse has warned passing ships of the treacherous rock below since its completion in 1809. It provides the first beacon along the northern coast of Anglesey for east-bound ships. It is followed by lighthouses, fog horns and other markers at North Stack, Holyhead Breakwater, The Skerries, the Mice, Point Lynas and at the south-east tip of the island Trwyn Du. The lighthouse is operated remotely by Trinity House. It has been visited by the team at Most Haunted.

Visitors can climb to the top of the lighthouse and tour the engine room and exhibition area.  The lighthouse is open seasonally.

See also

 List of lighthouses in Wales

References

External links
 Trinity House 

Lighthouses completed in 1809
Lighthouses in Anglesey
Museums in Anglesey
Lighthouse museums in the United Kingdom
Maritime museums in Wales
1809 establishments in Wales
Grade II listed lighthouses
Grade II listed buildings in Anglesey
Trearddur